Chicana/o studies, also known as Chican@ studies, originates from the Chicano Movement of the late 1960s and 1970s, and is the study of the Chicana/o and Latina/o experience. Chican@ studies draws upon a variety of fields, including history, sociology, the arts, and Chican@ literature. The area of studies additionally emphasizes the importance of Chican@ educational materials taught by Chican@ educators for Chican@ students.

In many universities across the United States, Chicana/o Studies is linked with other ethnic studies, such as Black Studies, Asian American Studies, and Native American Studies. Many students who have studied anthropology have also been involved in varying degrees of Chicana/o studies. Today, most major universities in areas of high Chicana/o concentration have a formal Chicana/o studies department or interdisciplinary program. Providing Chican@ studies to Chican@ students has helped these students find a community which offers a curriculum that is unique to their own heritage.

Background 
The establishment of Chicanostudies in colleges and universities was in response to fundamental issues in the American educational system and how many Chicanos felt excluded from educational success in the United States. Specifically, one of the issues that led to the establishment of Chicano studies was how Mexican-Americans, and in turn the greater Latino community, were represented negatively in American history. An example where Mexican-Americans were portrayed negatively in American history is during the 19th century, when the territories of New Mexico and Arizona were not allowed to become states until there were more people of European descent living there to balance out the Mexican-Americans, who were thought of as lazy, talentless idlers. It also must be noted that these stereotypes have continued throughout the 20th and 21st centuries. Additionally, Chican@ scholars such as Felipe de Ortego y Gasca claim that Mexican-Americans are not seen as vital parts of general American history, but neglect to remember that after historical treaties such as the Treaty of Guadalupe Hidalgo of 1848, land originally belonging to Mexico has been a part of the United States for an extended period of time, and that those of Mexican descent have been "American" for over 160 years. Therefore, many Chicano scholars feel the need to have necessary programming that restructures the way in which Mexican-Americans are perceived in American education. Another reason for Chican@ studies was that traditionally Mexican-Americans had been exposed to "Western" culture and European history through the standard educational system, but those of European descent had never had to learn Mexican history or the history of Mexican-Americans. Additionally, the little material the European-American community was taught about Mexican-Americans was framed in the context of European-American narratives, in other words meaning that the historical focus was not placed on Mexican-Americans and Mexican-Americans were often portrayed negatively. For that reason, Chican@ studies was created to combat traditional education that excludes Mexican-American history and furthers harmful stereotypes about Mexican-Americans.

Furthermore, Chican@ studies was created to ensure Chican@ students have access to Chican@ education that is taught by Chican@s. In addition to the exclusion of Mexican-American narratives in American education and the negative perceptions of Mexican-Americans, professors and educators in higher education were rarely Chican@. Even at the nascency of Chican@ studies, the first teachers of this material were the only Chican@ professors at the institution. Therefore, another reason Chican@ studies was implemented at colleges and universities was to ensure diversity in the faculty of higher education and to demonstrate to Chican@ students that professional careers surrounding education can be an option for them as well.

History

1960s 

Many Chican@ scholars agree that Chican@ studies came about as a result of the Chicana@ student movements, whether they were in the form of protests, activism or just taking part in el movimiento, also known as the Chicano movement. Chican@ studies was seen as a way to advance Mexican American perspectives on culture, history and literature. The major push for universities and colleges to include Chican@ studies came within the context of the African-American civil rights struggle. During the 1960s, Mexican American educators demanded that colleges and universities address the pedagogical needs of Mexican American students. Scholar Rodolfo Acuña noted that this was especially important because Mexican American student populations grew significantly in the 1960s. In addition, many young people and students were becoming very politically active and began to organize for political causes. A student organization that grew out of the civil rights movements of the '60s was the Mexican American Youth Organization (MAYO), which began to work towards educational reform. MAYO was very active in promoting student walkouts in Texas and California to highlight problems that Mexican American students faced. As students became more organized, they began to develop "experimental colleges" where informal classes on topics important to the Chican@ movement were taught.

In 1963, Manuel H. Guerra, professor at the University of Southern California and chair of the Mexican American Political Association's (MAPA) Education Committee, reported on "serious discriminatory policies and practices" at his university in relation to hiring Mexican Americans, especially considering that there had been an increase in the number of Mexican American students. According to scholar Rodolfo Acuña, serving Mexican American students without providing Mexican American faculty was considered a sort of colonialism and cultural assimilation. In addition, many Mexican American students were put at a disadvantage because speaking Spanish (even outside of class) was considered "degrading" or "un-American." Opportunities such as the Educational Opportunity Program (EOP) helped increase the number of minorities entering colleges and universities. Educators and students alike began to visualize "an academic program that could serve and transform the Mexican American community," a program that would become Chican@ studies and which was built by and for Chican@s.

In 1967, anthropologist Octavio Romano and Nick C. Vaca, in addition to graduate students at the University of California, Berkeley, began to publish a Chican@ studies journal called El Grito: A Journal of Contemporary Mexican-American Thought. Many of the ideas surrounding the formation of later Chican@ studies programs stemmed from this publication. One major idea that was put forth in El Grito by its editors was that Mexican Americans, in contrast to other ethnic groups, have kept their Mexican-American culture intact and have "refused to disappear into The Great American Melting Pot." The consequence of this, said the editors, was that Mexican Americans were kept in an economically and politically impoverished state. Also in 1967, political scientist Ralph Guzmán conducted a study with the Los Angeles State College which laid the foundation for a national center of Mexican American studies at California State College, Los Angeles (CSCLA). Both Mexican American and Black Student Unions pressed CSCLA to have ethnic studies classes at this time.

The Plan de Santa Barbara is generally considered to be the manifesto of Chican@ studies. Drafted in 1969 at the University of California, Santa Barbara, the plan emphasizes the need for education, and especially higher education to enact Chican@ community empowerment. The Plan helped to "establish Chicana/o studies as an entity incorporated into the structures of academia." However, while the Plan articulated a need for education, it did not specify how to create a program of study. The Plan did, however, lead to the creation of the Chican@ Studies Institute in 1969. Another important document in Chican@ studies was also produced in 1969. In March 1969, the Chican@ Youth Conference held in Denver produced a plan written by Chican@ poet, Alurista. It was called El Plan Espiritual de Aztlán (The Spiritual Plan of Aztlán) and it contains a concept of "ethnic nationalism and self-determination." The idea of the mythic homeland of the Aztec people, Aztlán, is one that unifies the United States and Mexico and correspondingly, united Mexican Americans with a sense of nationalism.

1970s 
In 1970, the first volume of Aztlán: A Journal of Chicano Studies was published by students at the University of California, Los Angeles (UCLA). Aztlán had a big influence on the discourse surrounding Chican@ studies and was the reason behind the founding of many Chican@ studies in colleges and universities. The name of the journal came directly from El Plan Espiritual de Aztlán and under the direction of the historian Juan Gomez-Quiñones, the journal supported and sustained a culture of activism. Chican@ scholars in 1970 also wrote papers for the Chicano Studies Institute which were later published in the journal, Epoca. These papers addressed topics such as Chican@ curriculum, goals of the educational program and how to achieve academic recognition.

In 1973, the University of California, Berkeley recognized the need to provide quality library materials to support the Chican@ studies programs, and in a more general sense to have academic spaces for Chican@ studies and Chican@ students. Researchers began to study the impact that these new programs had on students, finding that Mexican-American students responded positively to Chican@ studies and also to bilingual classes. Many scholars felt that the philosophy of education in the United States at the time was "inconsistent with the values of the Chicano movement" and that Chican@ studies needed to create tools for students to use in the real world and also a new type of research to solve problems. It was also important to find ways to recruit Chican@ teachers and administration within the schools to support students and research. Further support for Chican@ studies came in the form of the National Association of Chicana and Chicano Studies (NACCS) which was created in 1972 in San Antonio, Texas. The NACCS allows scholars in Chican@ studies to exchange ideas, share research, communicate, and it also has an annual conference. The conferences were important to help bring together scholars and legitimize Chican@ studies, since other disciplines have similar annual conferences. Through these conferences and the many other initiatives organized by Chican@ students and educators, many Chican@ studies programs were in place at major universities by 1975.

1980s 
Chican@ studies went through structural shifts in its message and mission during the late 1970s and 1980s. During this period, Chican@ studies began to include women, the LGBTQ+ community, and other minority groups under the umbrella of "Chicano" while also acknowledging the many differences within the group.  In 1981, the Mexican American Studies and Research Center (MASRC) at the University of Arizona was established.  In 2009, MASRC became a department and continued public policy research and addressing issues of concern to Mexican American communities. As of 2019, MASRC is now known as the Department of Mexican American Studies and offers bachelor's degrees, master's degrees, and a Ph.D. degree in Mexican American Studies. The idea of the "borderland" or nepantla grew stronger than the idea of Aztlán by the 1980s and Chican@s celebrated the many different (often conflicting) aspects of themselves. Borderlands/La Frontera: The New Mestiza (1987) by Gloria Anzaldúa both grew out of and signifies this change. Chican@ studies became less about nationalism, and more about belonging to a group and contributing to "something greater." This shift helped reshape the mission of Chican@ studies and gave it "new life" and "new authority."

The 1980s saw more Chican@ Studies programs integrated into institutions of higher learning while it also created a "canonical approach" to its studies and "gatekeeping procedures" to evaluate promotions and tenure. In addition, Chican@ studies programs helped universities and colleges fulfill Affirmative Action requirements. During the mid 1990s, however, a study found that most Chican@ studies programs were still very non-uniform. Part of the reason that many Chican@ studies programs were not consistent in what was studied is that a core curriculum had not yet been formally published. The first primer of Chican@ studies was published in 1980 by Diego Vigil, called From Indians to Chicanos: A Sociocultural History. In addition, there was a lack of Chican@ faculty with only 1.2% of faculty at U.S. colleges and universities having any "Hispanic" ethnicity at all in 1985. Many of the faculty teaching Chican@ studies didn't feel that their own programs were "qualitatively sound."

2010s 
In 2017, scholar S.M. Contreras noted a change in the language surrounding Chicana/o people, as they have begun to add an "X" or an "@" in place of the "a/o." This new language is a result of the movement towards gender inclusivity and as a way to recognize Chican@ people whose gender identity does not coincide with the gender binary.

Ideological approaches 

There are two ideological approaches to the institutionalization of Chican@ Studies as a formal discipline. The first approach is Pragmatism, an approach which emphasizes social responsibility and is supported by prominent scholar, Rodolfo Acuña. The second approach is Perspectivism, an approach which emphasizes introspection and is supported by prominent scholar, Michael Soldatenko.

However, the Chican@ Studies discipline is not limited to these perspectives. Scholar Raoul Contreras, for example, considers Chican@ Internal Colonialism and Chican@ Self-Determination to be important issues that are explored within Chican@ Studies.

Pragmatism 
Pragmatism is an ideological approach to Chican@ studies. This ideology emphasizes political activism and social responsibility. Adherents to this approach believe it is the community's job to insert themselves into the workings of the current educational system to demand formal recognition of Chican@ studies as a discipline. Additionally, it is vital that resources such as staff and offices are acquired in order to institutionalize the discipline. Rafael Pérez-Torres, author of "Chicana/o Studies's Two Paths", highlights that this approach has faced criticism due to its tendency to allow for the over politicization of Chican@ issues. He identifies the argument that it creates a forum focused on “separatist politics” and neglects the furtherance of the institutionalization of the field of study. In other words, the ideology fails to fulfill the aim of integrating Chican@ studies into the US educational system and, instead, places exclusive focus on the political issues surrounding ethnicity. However, Sarita E. Brown et al. argue that political mobilization is key to the Pragmatic approach. They contend that Chican@ political advocacy should emphasize the lobbying of government officials for pro-Chican@ studies policies.

Rodolfo Acuña, former chair at the Department of Chican@ Studies at California State University, Northridge and prominent scholar in the field, fervently emphasizes the importance of sacrifice and struggle in order to institutionalize and gain formal respect for the field of Chican@ Studies. Acuña frames the quest for institutionalization as a gritty battle to be waged by students and faculty.

Perspectivism 
Perspectivism is another ideological approach to Chican@ studies. This ideology emphasizes intellectualism, introspection, and academic expertise. This ideology neglects the needs for social change and, instead, exclusively focuses on engagement with relevant scholarship. Perspectivists believe individual ambition, pursuit of respect, and the studying of relevant Chican@ issues will lead to the institutionalization of Chican@ studies. Additionally, the creation of intellectual communities, research centers, and other forums for academe further validate the field of Chican@ studies. This validation continues to help facilitate the institutionalization of the discipline.

In addition, Michael Soldatenko, the former chair of the Department of Chican@ Studies at California State University, Los Angeles and a prominent scholar in the field of Chican@ studies, has discovered a new popularity surrounding the perspectivist approach. The ideological approach to Chican@ studies has shifted from pragmatic to perspectivist since the 1970s. Thus, according to Soldatenko, the approach's widespread popularity signals its significance to the furtherance of the field of Chican@ studies.

Responses to Chican@ studies

Positive 
Responses to Chican@ studies and its impact on the greater American educational system can be separated into two categories, positive and negative. Those who see the programs and studies as positive believe that Chican@ studies create positive academic changes in Chican@ students. For example, Chican@ educator Curtis Acosta noted the shift in Chican@ students' minds after they were exposed to literature that was written by Chican@s and intended for Chican@s. For according to Acosta, Chican@s often felt excluded by traditional educational systems, and felt as if they are not meant for educational success, or that success is tied to "whiteness," an educational standard that they can not attain. Acosta noted that the students that were exposed to Chican@ literature felt empowered and believed that educational success and higher education was meant for them. Therefore, those who view the studies as positive believe Chican@ education assists in Chican@ students' academic growth and in their realization that education is not inextricably linked to being white.

Negative 
Those who view Chican@ studies as negative believe that the area of studies creates further problems for Chican@ students and the greater American educational system. Chican@ studies opposers cite that the education in Chican@ classes teach anti-whiteness and a disdain for those of European descent. In addition, opposers believe that Chican@ studies allow Mexican-American students to feel as if they are victims or sufferers of Anglo-America. Furthermore, some believe that having education dedicated for a certain type of student creates self-segregation and further separation from the non-Chican@, particularly white, students. Another type of criticism comes from some Chican@s as well, who believe that Chican@ studies create students who become bothersome activists and generate a new wave movement that is not needed or wanted. Either way, opposers of the studies remain a strong voice (in addition to the supporters) in the continued conversation surrounding Chican@ studies.

Legal restrictions

On May 11, 2010, the Governor of Arizona, Jan Brewer, signed House Bill 2281, or HB 2281. This bill prohibits course curricula within a school district or charter school from advocating ethnic solidarity or promoting insurgency, racism, or classism. Additionally, the course curriculum may not be designed exclusively for one ethnicity. However, Native American classes still comply with federal law. In addition, the grouping of classes based on academic performance is still permissible. Course curriculum concerning the history of a specific ethnic group or about controversial history which is available to all students is acceptable, as well. Another provision of the law stated that any school district or charter school breaching its stated provisions would be liable to lose state funding as a public institution.

Subsequently, the Mexican-American studies program taught in the Tucson Unified School District (TUSD) was found to be in violation of House Bill 2281 by the former Arizona Superintendent, Tom Horne. On the contrary, an independent audit, paid for by the state of Arizona, found the program was not in violation of HB 2281. However, after TUSD issued an appeal stating the program was in violation, Superintendent John Huppenthal decided that the course must be disbanded instead of relinquishing state funding. Thus, in January 2012, the TUSD school board came to a 4-1 decision that the program was to be disbanded as to not lose state funding for the district. Furthermore, HB 2281 facilitated more challenges and limitations on classes teaching Chicana/o studies not just in Arizona, but across the United States.

Scholars 
 Curtis Acosta (Professor of Education)
Rodolfo Acuña
 Gloria Anzaldúa
 Cecilia Preciado de Burciaga
 Luis Leal
 Amalia Mesa-Bains
 Isidro Ortiz
 Jacinto Quirarte
 María Guillermina Valdes Villalva
 Refugio Rochin (Founder Smithsonian Latino Center)
 Felipe de Ortego y Gasca (Founding Director Chicana/o Studies, University of Texas—El Paso, 1970)

Programs and departments
This is an abbreviated list of programs throughout the United States which can be associated with Chicana/o Studies.
 Chicano/Latino Studies Program, University of California, Berkeley
 Department of Chicano Studies, California State University, Los Angeles 
 Department of Chicana and Chicano Studies, California State University, Northridge 
 Chicano/Latino Studies, Portland State University, OR
 César C. Chávez Department of Chicana & Chicano Studies, University of California, Los Angeles
 Department of Chicano/Latino Studies, University of California, Irvine
 Department of Chican@ Studies, University of California, Santa Barbara
 Center for Mexican American Studies (CMAS), The University of Texas at Arlington
 Department of Mexican American Studies, University of Arizona
 Chicano Studies, California State University, Bakersfield
 Transborder Chicano/a Latino/a Studies, Arizona State University
 Department of Chicana and Chicano Studies, California State University, Dominguez Hills
 Chicana and Chicano Studies Program, California State University, Fullerton
 Intecollegiate Chicana/o Latina/o Studies Department at the Claremont Colleges, Claremont Colleges (Claremont McKenna College)
 Department of Chicana/o and Latina/o Studies, Loyola Marymount University
Department of Chicana/o Studies, Metropolitan State College of Denver
Department of Chicana & Chicano Studies, San Diego State University
Chicanx/Latinx Studies , Scripps College
Chicana/o-Latina/o Studies, Stanford University
Chicana and Chicano Studies Program, University of California, Davis
Chicano and Latino Studies, University of Minnesota
Chicana and Chicano Studies, University of New Mexico
Center for Mexican-American Studies, University of Texas at Austin
Mexican-American Studies Program, University of Texas at San Antonio
Chicana/o Studies, University of Texas at El Paso
Chicano Studies, University of Washington
Chican@ and Latin@ Studies, University of Wisconsin–Madison
Chicano Studies Program, University of Wyoming
Chicano/Latino Studies, PhD Program, Michigan State University
Department of Chicana/Chicano and Hemispheric Studies, Western New Mexico University

See also
 Asian American studies
 Black studies
 Chicano art
 Chicano art movement
 Hijas de Cuauhtémoc
 Hijas de Cuauhtémoc
 UCLA Chicano Studies Research Center
 Chicano Movement
 Gender studies
 Latino studies
 Mexican Studies (journal)
 Native American studies
 Walkout
 Stand and Deliver

Further reading

References

External links
 Latin American, Caribbean, U.S. Latinx, and Iberian Online Free E-Resources (LACLI). 
 National Association for Chicana and Chicano studies
 Tomás Rivera Policy Institute

Chicano
Ethnic studies
Latin American studies
American studies
Critical race theory